Eddy Merckx is a Brussels Metro station on the western branch of line 5. It is located in the municipality of Anderlecht, in the western part of Brussels, Belgium. It is named after the Belgian cyclist Eddy Merckx, five-times winner of the Tour de France.

The station opened on 15 September 2003 as part of the Bizet–Erasme/Erasmus extension of former line 1B including the stations Erasme/Erasmus, CERIA/COOVI and La Roue/Het Rad. It is decorated with objects commemorating Merckx, including, displayed in a glass cabinet on the station platform, the bicycle on which he set the hour record in 1972. Following the reorganisation of the Brussels Metro on 4 April 2009, it is served by line 5.

External links

Brussels metro stations
Railway stations opened in 2003
Anderlecht
Eddy Merckx